General elections were held in Liberia in 1889. In the presidential election, the result was a victory for incumbent Hilary R. W. Johnson of the True Whig Party, who was re-elected for a fourth term, the first candidate to achieve four consecutive election victories.

References

Liberia
1889 in Liberia
Elections in Liberia
One-party elections
Election and referendum articles with incomplete results